Pechengsky (masculine), Pechengskaya (feminine), or Pechengskoye (neuter) may refer to:
Pechengsky District (est. 1945), a district of Murmansk Oblast, Russia
Pechengskoye Rural Community (1861–1866), a rural community of Kemsky Uyezd of Arkhangelsk Governorate, Russian Empire
Pechengskaya Volost (1866–1868, 1871–1921), a volost of Kemsky Uyezd of Arkhangelsk Governorate, Russian Empire